Kshetrimayum Thoiba Singh (born 1 December 1955) is an Indian field hockey player, who represented India at the Olympics and Asian Games. He played as a left-winger and was known for his speed and stamina. Today he coaches the Imphal Rangers, hockey team.

Early life
Born on 1 February 1961, in Imphal, Manipur, India, to Ksh. Giridhon Singh and Ksh(o) Maikoibi Devi, Thoiba Singh took to hockey early on in life, and soon found his natural talent in the game.

Professional career

He was a member of the 1988 Summer Olympics field hockey team in which India came in the 6th place. Other than Olympics, he represented India at Asia Cup 1985, 1989; Champions Trophy 1985, 1989; Azlan Shah Trophy 1985; 1986 Asian Games, 1990; World Cup 1986; Indo-Pak Test Series 1986; Five-nation 1988 and Indira Gandhi tournament 1987.
Presently working as Dy. General Manager, Food Corporation of India, Regional Office, Imphal, Manipur

See also
 India at the 1988 Summer Olympics

References

External links
About Thoiba Singh from Sports-Reference.com

Indian field hockey coaches
1961 births
Living people
Olympic field hockey players of India
Indian male field hockey players
Field hockey players from Manipur
People from Imphal West district
Field hockey players at the 1986 Asian Games
Field hockey players at the 1988 Summer Olympics
Field hockey players at the 1990 Asian Games
Asian Games medalists in field hockey
Asian Games silver medalists for India
Asian Games bronze medalists for India
Medalists at the 1986 Asian Games
Medalists at the 1990 Asian Games
1990 Men's Hockey World Cup players